Hong Kong Rangers Football Club, often abbreviated to Rangers, currently known as Biu Chun Rangers due to sponsorship reasons, is a Hong Kong football club which currently competes in the Hong Kong Premier League. They have won the Hong Kong First Division once, the Senior Shield 4 times, and the Hong Kong FA Cup twice.

History

Formation to 2000

The club was founded in 1958 by a Scottish expatriate from Glasgow named Ian Petrie. He named his club after Rangers. It was the first Asian football club with a modern football club managing system.  In the early days, the club could not compete with the bigger clubs financially so Petrie relied on young players and the team was known as a breeding ground for young players. Kwok Ka Ming was the best known players discovered by Petrie in the 1960s. In 1970, the club brought three Scottish professional players to Hong Kong. They were the first European professional players to play in the Hong Kong league, opening a new chapter in Hong Kong's football history. Great players such as Ian Taylor, Joe Brennan, Jimmy Liddell, and Derek Currie were a few to name. More were to follow in the 1980s such as Steve Paterson, Jimmy Bone and Tommy Nolan.

2000–2018

Since 12 October 2001, the club had been named after its sponsor, Buler, resulting in the name Buler Rangers up until summer 2006. On 15 September 2007, the club announced that it has secured a large sponsorship from Bulova, a watch brand which used to fund a famous Hong Kong football team decades ago, and used Bulova Rangers as the team name.

In 2011, the team changed their name as Kam Fung. They were the champions of the 2011–12 Hong Kong Second Division and were promoted to the Hong Kong First Division. The club has since renamed itself as Biu Chun Rangers due to being sponsorship by Biu Chun Watch Hands (except for the 2016–17 season when the club was renamed as Lee Man Rangers due to sponsorship reasons).

In the early part of the 2000s, Rangers' investment in youth player produced various Hong Kong internationals including Chan Wai Ho, Man Pei Tak, Lam Ka Wai and Lo Kwan Yee. However, this investment dried up in the later part of the 2010s resulting in lower budgets and declining performances of the club.

2018–present
Following a last place finish in the 2017–18 Hong Kong Premier League, Rangers were relegated back the First Division after a six-year stay in the top flight. Former Hong Kong international Wong Chin Hung was hired as the club's head coach.

Despite a third place finish in the 2018–19 season, Rangers were promoted back into the Hong Kong Premier League on 15 July 2019 following Dreams FC's decision to self-relegate. 

In 2019–20, Rangers were one of four teams that withdrew from the Premier League season due to the 2020 coronavirus pandemic in Hong Kong.

Name history 
1958–1995: Rangers (香港流浪)
1995–1997: UHLSPORT Rangers (UHLSPORT流浪)
1997–1999: Rangers (香港流浪)
1999: Rangers (奇利寶流浪)
1999–2001: Rangers (香港流浪)
2001–2006: Buler Rangers (澎馬流浪)
2006–2007: Rangers (香港流浪)
2007–2008: Bulova Rangers (寶路華流浪)
2008–2009: Rangers (香港流浪)
2009–2010: Ongood (安華)
2010–2011: Biu Chun (標準錶針)
2011–2012: Kam Fung (金鋒科技)
2012–2016: Biu Chun Rangers (標準流浪)
2016–2017: Lee Man Rangers (理文流浪)
2017–: Biu Chun Rangers (標準流浪)

Team staff
{|class="wikitable"
|-
!Position
!Staff
|-
|Director of football|| Philip Lee
|-
|Co-head coaches|| Chiu Chung Man   Wong Chin Hung Lai Ka Fai
|-
|Assistant coach|| Fernando Lopes
|-
|Goalkeeping coach|| Cheung Wai Hong
|-
|Technical director|| Fung Wing Shing

Current squad

First Team

 FP
 FP
 FP
 FP

 FP

 FP
 FP

 FP

Out on loan

Remarks:
LP These players are registered as local players in Hong Kong domestic football competitions.
FP These players are registered as foreign players.

Reserve team squad

Continental record

Honours
Major trophies are listed below.

League
Hong Kong First Division
Champions (1): 1970–71
Hong Kong Second Division
Champions (2): 1964–65, 2011–12
Hong Kong Third 'A' Division
Champions (1): 1991–92

Cup competitions
Hong Kong Senior Shield
Champions (4): 1965–66, 1970–71, 1974–75, 1994–95
Runners-up (2): 1975–76, 1981–82
Hong Kong FA Cup
Champions (2): 1976–77, 1994–95
Runners-up (3): 1974–75, 1982–83, 2002–03
Hong Kong Viceroy Cup
Champions (2): 1973–74, 1974–75

Seasons

Remarks:
FP These players are registered as foreign players.

Retired numbers

Managers
 Goran Paulić (July 5, 2012 – Nov 4, 2012)
 Chan Hung Ping (2012–2013)
 José Ricardo Rambo (July 6, 2013 – 2014)
 Cheung Po Chun (2014–2015)
 Yan Lik Kin (2015)
 José Ricardo Rambo (2015–2016)
 Yan Lik Kin (2016)
 Fung Hoi Man (2016–2017)
 Lam Hing Lun (2017)
  Dejan Antonić (2017)
 Gerard Ambassa Guy (2017–2018)
 Fung Wing Sing (2018),  Su Yang (2018)
 Wong Chin Hung (2018–2019)
 Chiu Chung Man,  Wong Chin Hung,  Lai Ka Fai (2019–)

See also
 Fourway Athletics

References

External links
 Hong Kong Rangers F.C. Official website
 Hong Kong Rangers F.C. Official Facebook Page

 
Football clubs in Hong Kong
Hong Kong Premier League
Association football clubs established in 1958
1958 establishments in Hong Kong